Chrostosoma pellucida is a moth of the subfamily Arctiinae. It was described by William Schaus in 1905. It is found in Peru.

References

Biodiversity Heritage Library

Chrostosoma
Moths described in 1905